José Rogério dos Anjos Filipe da Conceição Samora (28 October 1958 – 15 December 2021) was a Portuguese film, television and stage actor.

Biography
He appeared in more than one hundred films since 1980.

On 20 July 2021, Rogério Samora suffered two cardiorespiratory arrests during recordings of SIC's soap opera Amor Amor. Subsequently he was hospitalized in a coma. He died on 15 December 2021, at the age of 63.

Career

Selected filmography

References

External links
 

1958 births
2021 deaths
20th-century Portuguese male actors
21st-century Portuguese male actors
People from Lisbon
Portuguese male film actors
Portuguese male television actors
Portuguese male stage actors